El Achour is a suburb of the city of Algiers in northern Algeria.

The head office of the French-language newspaper Liberté is in El Achour.

Notable people

References

Suburbs of Algiers
Communes of Algiers Province
Algiers Province